The 2010 Notre Dame Fighting Irish football team represented the University of Notre Dame in the 2010 NCAA Division I FBS football season. The team was coached by Brian Kelly and played its home games at Notre Dame Stadium in South Bend, Indiana. This was Kelly's first season as Notre Dame's head coach, after leading the Cincinnati Bearcats to a 12–0 regular season and BCS bowl berth. In 2010, Notre Dame's regular season schedule was ranked the most difficult schedule in the nation with a Team Opposition Record Percentage of .6529 (the poll published by the NCAA only includes wins against Division 1 teams). They finished the season 8–5 and were invited to the Sun Bowl where they defeated the Miami Hurricanes, 33–17.

Pre-season

Coaching changes
Following the 2009 season, Notre Dame fired head coach Charlie Weis after the Irish finished 6-6, well below expectations of competing for a BCS bowl berth. Brian Kelly was named as his replacement on Dec 10, 2009. Running Backs coach Tony Alford was the lone assistant retained from Weis's staff. Before Rob Ianello could be considered, he took the head job at the University of Akron Ron Powlus followed Ianello to Akron.

Player departures
Irish stars Jimmy Clausen and Golden Tate chose to forgo their final years of eligibility and declare for the 2010 NFL draft. The Irish also lost a number of seniors to graduation, including linemen Eric Olsen, Paul Duncan and four-year starter Sam Young. Other notable losses included running back James Aldridge, wideout Robby Parris, and George West on offense. On defense, ND lost senior captains Kyle McCarthy and Scott Smith, Raeshon McNeil, Sergio Brown, John Ryan and Ray Herring to graduation. Standout special teams player Mike Anello also finished his final year of eligibility. Sophomore defensive back E.J Banks left the team in August 2010, but will still be enrolled at the school. On August 31, within days of the September 4 season opener against Purdue, sophomore wide receiver Shaquelle Evans was granted his release from the team, and decided to enroll at UCLA. Freshman Derek Roback also left the program in early September, as his desire to play quarterback led to his transfer to Ohio

Player additions
With his first recruiting class, Brian Kelly received 23 signed commitments from high school players across the United States. Among them was five early-enrollees: Quarterback Tommy Rees, Wide Receiver Tai-ler Jones, Cornerback Lo Wood, Cornerback Spencer Boyd and Safety Chris Badger. Spencer Boyd transferred to USF in early July, and Chris Badger left on a two-year Mormon mission to Ecuador in August. On April 2, 2010 Notre Dame recruit Matt James, who committed to Notre Dame on National Signing Day, died when he fell from a three-story hotel balcony in Panama City, Florida.

Schedule

Personnel

Coaching staff

Roster

Game summaries

Purdue

Brian Kelly's debut with Notre Dame

Michigan

Michigan State

Stanford

Boston College

Pittsburgh

Western Michigan

Navy

Tulsa

Utah

Army

Notre Dame wore green jerseys

USC

 
On a rainy Southern California night, the Trojans' Joe Houston kicked a 45-yard field goal to give USC a first quarter lead. The second quarter, however, belonged to the Irish, as QB Tommy Rees completed a pair of 1-yard pass touchdowns to Michael Floyd and Duval Kamara, with Kamara's coming just before the half. David Ruffer missed the extra point on the second touchdown.
In the third quarter, the Trojans kicked a field goal and Mitch Mustain ran in for a 1-yard touchtown, which was aided by a Notre Dame fumble. Joe Houston's 37-yard field goal gave the Trojans a fourth quarter lead. But Notre Dame came back with a 5-yard rush touchdown by Robert Hughes to give the Irish the lead back and the game. Notre Dame finally ended USC's streak of consecutive victories, which dated back to 2001. USC's attempt to come back was stopped by a Notre Dame interception at the one-yard line.

Miami (FL)
 

Tommy Rees passed for 201 yards and two touchdowns to Michael Floyd as Notre Dame beat Miami 33–17. After a 20-year hiatus in the series, it was all Irish in the latest installment of a storied rivalry that became known during the 1980s as "Catholics versus Convicts." The Irish reached the end zone on three of its first four possessions. Rees tossed TD passes of 3 and 34 yards to Floyd and Cierre Wood broke free on a 34-yard scoring run. David Ruffer added field goals from 40, 50 and 19 yards. The Irish defense picked off Miami starting quarterback Jacory Harris 3 times and logged 4 total interceptions in the first half to help the team jump out to a 27–0 lead in the first half. The Hurricanes tried to rally in the 4th quarter behind backup quarterback Stephen Morris, who threw a 6-yard touchdown to Leonard Hankerson and a 42-yard scoring play to Tommy Streeter, but it was too late by then. Rees was able to make some key first downs to effectively run out the clock late in the 4th quarter.
The game sold out in 21 hours, the fastest in the Sun Bowl's 77-year history, and the crowd of 54,021 set a bowl attendance record. Floyd's two touchdowns pushed him past Jeff Samardzija and Golden Tate to claim 28 career touchdowns, the most in Irish history. Senior safety Harrison Smith logged three interceptions in the first half, tying the Sun Bowl record. The Irish victory also made Brian Kelly the first Fighting Irish coach to win a bowl game in his first season (Notre Dame did not play in bowl-games from the 1925 through 1968 seasons due to a self-imposed ban on post-season play).

Postseason

Awards
National awards

Lou Groza Award
David Ruffer (finalist)

All-Americans

References

Notre Dame
Notre Dame Fighting Irish football seasons
Sun Bowl champion seasons
Notre Dame Fighting Irish football